The Gurgui is a right tributary of the river Bistrița in Romania. It flows into the Bistrița north of the village Bistrița.

References

Rivers of Romania
Rivers of Vâlcea County